Long Shot is a Canadian current affairs television series which aired on CBC Television in 1959.

Premise
Ross McLean, previously of Tabloid, produced this series which combined interviews with humour. Career broadcaster Ward Cornell and Toronto Symphony Orchestra cellist Olga Kwasniak were its hosts. Guests ranged from writers to wrestlers, including Bob and Ray, Boxcar Betty, Gregory Clark, Jack Douglas, Harry Golden, Gene Kiniski, C. Northcote Parkinson, Hard Boiled Haggerty, Jonathan Winters and Yukon Eric.

Scheduling
This half-hour series was broadcast Sundays at 10:30 p.m. from 28 June to 27 September 1959 as a mid-year replacement for Fighting Words.

External links
 
 

CBC Television original programming
1959 Canadian television series debuts
1959 Canadian television series endings
Black-and-white Canadian television shows